Professor Madan Mohan मदनमोहन served as the National Commissioner of the Bharat Scouts and Guides from November 1959 to November 1960.

External links
 http://www.bsgindia.org/

Year of birth missing
Possibly living people
Scouting and Guiding in India